Tyler Jordan Sash (May 27, 1988 – September 8, 2015) was an American football safety for the University of Iowa Hawkeyes and the New York Giants of the National Football League (NFL). He was drafted by the Giants in the sixth round of the 2011 NFL Draft.

College career
Sash played safety while with the Iowa Hawkeyes. He had 13 career interceptions for the Hawkeyes, which was five shy of the school record for career interceptions, originally set by Nile Kinnick from 1937 to 1939. He holds the Iowa record for career interception return yards with 392, a mark which also ranks fifth in Big Ten history.

Sash was named to the 2010 preseason Lott Trophy watchlist, a trophy named in honor of former college and Pro Football Hall of Fame defensive back Ronnie Lott and presented annually to the college football defensive player of the year. He was also named to the 2010 preseason Bronko Nagurski watch list, awarded annually by the Football Writers Association of America to the nation's best defensive player.

Professional career
On January 13, 2011, Sash decided to forgo his senior season to make himself eligible for the 2011 NFL Draft. He was selected in the sixth round by the New York Giants and was a member of the Super Bowl XLVI championship squad. In July 2012, he was suspended for four games by the NFL after testing positive for Adderall, which is on the league's list of banned substances. Sash said in a statement that he took the drug legally and "under a doctor's care for an anxiety condition" to help him with public speaking. Sash was cut from the New York Giants on August 31, 2013.

Death

On September 8, 2015, Sash was found dead in his Oskaloosa, Iowa, home around 8 a.m. local time. He was 27. The autopsy report concluded that his death was caused by a mixture of drugs. On January 26, 2016, five months after his death, Sash's family released the results of testing performed on his brain, confirming that he was suffering from stage 2 chronic traumatic encephalopathy (CTE), a degenerative brain disease caused by head injuries, at the time of his death.

References

External links

New York Giants bio
Iowa Hawkeyes bio

1988 births
2015 deaths
Drug-related deaths in Iowa
People from Oskaloosa, Iowa
Players of American football from Iowa
American football players with chronic traumatic encephalopathy
American football safeties
Iowa Hawkeyes football players
New York Giants players